Buriram United Football Club is a Thai professional football club based in Buriram. The club has played at the top level of Thai football for the majority of their existence and is competing in the Thai League 1. The club was founded in 1970 as PEA FC (Provincial Electricity Authority Football Club) before being reformed as Buriram PEA and Buriram United in 2010 and 2012 respectively. Their home stadium is Chang Arena, which has a capacity of 32,600.

Buriram United won their first Thai League 1 title in 2008 and the Kor Royal Cup in 1998, as PEA FC. The club was previously based in Ayutthaya before moving east to Buriram for the 2010 season. In the 2011 season, Buriram PEA were the first team in Thai football history to win all the domestic trophies, as the triple champions of the (2011 Thai Premier League, 2011 Thai FA Cup, and 2011 Thai League Cup).

History

Origins: "Provincial Electricity Authority", 1970–2009

The club was founded in 1970, but their first big success came in 1998 by winning the third division of the Kor Royal Cup. The club was then promoted to the Thai Division 1 League. In 2002–03 the club finished third in the second division. They then competed the Thai League 1 Relegation play-off, but lost the final match 0–1 to Thailand Tobacco Monopoly FC. A year later, they succeeded at the end of season 2003–04 with promotion to the Thai Premier League. PEA surprised everyone by becoming the league runner-up at the end of their first Premier League season. Being the runner-up entitled the club to participate in the AFC Champions League. It was the first participation in an international competition for the club. However, the club was excluded from the competition. In the following two seasons, 2006 and 2007, the PEA took place only 10 and 8 at the end of the season.

In 2008 Provincial Electricity Authority relocated to Ayutthaya and played at Ayutthaya Province Stadium, where they gained a bigger fan base. The club played under the nickname of Faifa Ayutthaya (Electric Ayutthaya) from media and its fans. Under the head coach Prapol Pongpanich, PEA eventually won their first championship in Thai League 1. The club qualified for 2009 AFC Champions League preliminary round.

In 2009, PEA was eliminated from the 2009 AFC Champions League after losing 1–4 to Singapore Armed Forces in the extra-time at Rajamangala Stadium. PEA began their title defence campaign of the Thai Premier League with poor performance. Prapon Pongpanich was sacked in the middle of the season and replaced by former Thailand national team head coach Thongsuk Sampahungsith. The club finished in ninth place out of sixteen in the final standings.

Breath of Buriram

In December 2009, it was announced that a politician based in Buriram, Newin Chidchob was to take over the club. He had already tried unsuccessfully to take over TOT SC and Royal Thai Army FC Newin relocated the club to Buriram in Isan and rebranded it to Buriram PEA Football Club. The Buriram PEA inherited most of the players from the former PEA club including the stars like Rangsan Viwatchaichok, Apichet Puttan and Theerathon Bunmathan. Pongphan Wongsuwan who was a long-time head coach of TOT S.C. was instated as a coach. Thailand national team member Suchao Nuchnum of TOT S.C. also followed his coach to the new team.

Buriram PEA finished their first season after the transition as the runner-up of the 2010 Thai Premier League. The club reached the final of the 2010 Thai League Cup but lost 0–1 to Thai Port at Supachalasai Stadium.

The Greatest in Thailand
In 2011, Buriram PEA under the coaching of Attaphol Buspakom, completed their 2011 season with the domestic treble by winning all three Thai major trophies. Buriram won 2011 Thai Premier League with 85 points, the highest record in the league history. They beat the arch-rival Muangthong United in the 2011 Thai FA Cup final and clinched their first Thai FA Cup title. Following the success in two other competitions, Buriram avenged their previous year League Cup final defeat against the same opponent, Thai Port, and won the 2010 Thai League Cup. Buriram PEA became the first Thai club to win such a treble in a season.

Buriram stadium "The Thunder Castle", was built in 2011 – when it became the first Thailand football stadium without a treadmill on the side of the field  and it was also recorded in the Guinness World Records as the FIFA standard football field where took a shortest construction time for 256 days. 

In 2012, At the start of the 2012 season, the club was renamed Buriram United Football Club. In the first match of the group stages of the 2012 AFC Champions League, Buriram beat the 2011 J-League champion, Kashiwa Reysol, 3–2 and became "the first Thai and South East Asian club" to earn a victory against a J-League club in ACL since starting the Champions League system in 2003. In the second match, Buriram was the visiting team against the 2011 CSL Champion, Guangzhou Evergrande. Buriram also became "the first Thai and South East Asian club" to earn a victory against a Chinese club "in China" after beating Guangzhou Evergrande 1–2 in Tianhe Stadium from Suchao Nuchnum and Frank Acheampong's goals.  That match was the end of a two-year unbeaten home record for Guangzhou.

2013 & 2015 - Quadruple Season
In 2014, under Spanish head coach Alejandro Menéndez, Buriram United became the first Thai club to achieve the quadruple by winning 4 trophies in the calendar year. The campaign included the titles of Kor Royal Cup, Thai League T1, Thai FA Cup and Thai League Cup. The league season was also finished with the first invincible title for the club, the second Thai team to have achieved such a feat, after Muangthong United in 2012.

In 2015, Brazilian coach Alexandre Gama guided Buriram United to, once again, win all four competitions in the 2016 calendar year : Kor Royal Cup, Thai League T1, Thai FA Cup and Thai League Cup.

Moreover, the 2015 Buriram United won the 2015 Thai Premier League with an unbeaten record. The Brazilian forward Diogo Luis Santo broke the top scoring record with 33 goals from 32 games and received Thai League T1 Top Scorer and Player of the Year Awards at the end of the year and Theerathon Bunmathan got top assists with 19 assists from 32 games in left back position.

Strike Back

In August 2016, Newin Chidchob admitted he was disappointed that his team's bid to defend their Thailand League title that season was over. Buriram United appointed Ranko Popović as the club manager to fill the vacant role after the dismissal of Afshin Ghotbi and former coach Bozidar Bandovic returned as the technical director of the club.

In June 2017, Ranko Popovic has resigned as coach after receiving a three-month ban by the Thai FA for slapping the face of Bangkok United physio Andy Schillinger following a heated argument after Buriram beat the capital side 2–1. Buriram United announced that they promoted Bozidar Bandovic to head coach from his position as technical director of football. 

In the same year, the club won the 2017 Thai League 1 and created history by claiming 86 points - the club's highest points in a single season.

In 2018, after finishing champions in the 2017 Thai League season, Buriram secured direct qualification into the 2018 AFC Champions League. In the group stages, a home, Buriram beat Cerezo Osaka 2–0 and Jeju United 1–0 and drew 1–1 Guangzhou Evergrande. The club lost 4–3 on aggregate in the Round of 16, against Korean side Jeonbuk Hyundai Motors.

In the same year, Buriram comfortably retained the 2018 Thai League 1 title with a record 87 points. Bozidar Bandovic received Thai League 1 Coach of the Year Award at the end of the season.

In 2022, under Japanese head coach Masatada Ishii, Buriram United winning 3 trophies in the calendar year. The campaign included the titles of Thai League 1, Thai FA Cup and Thai League Cup.

Crest

The club logo incorporates elements from the historical ancient stone castle, Phanom Rung.

Rivalries

Buriram United vs. Muangthong United in Thai League

Buriram United's main rival is Muangthong United. The two clubs are the powerhouses of Thai League 1 (T1). The rivalry between two clubs became highly competitive, since they are the only two clubs that have won the Thai League 1 championship since the 2009 season.

Buriram United and Muangthong United also represent widely different groups of supporters. Buriram represents the mostly rural people of the Thai countryside, while Muangthong United symbolizes the urban people in the Bangkok Metropolitan Region. Their rivalry also reflects political differences in Football Association of Thailand (FAT) since Muangthong United has the close relationship with FAT under the management of Worawi Makudi, while former politician Newin Chidchob became the polar opposite and frequently questions the transparency of FAT.

The games between the two teams are regarded as an important match-up in Thai football. Buriram has dominated the rivalry head-to-head and maintained an unbeaten record against Muangthong for a long time after the club relocated to Buriram. The phrase "Rather lose to anyone but Muangthong." (Thai lit. แพ้ใครก็ได้ แต่ไม่แพ้เมืองทอง) became a famous quote for fans. Their unbeaten record against Muangthong was broken in 2016 Thai League when they lost 0–3 to their rival at home.

Academy & Youth program
Buriram United opened its first youth academies in 2011. The club is particularly famous for its renowned youth programme that has produced many Thai talents over the years – Suphanat Mueanta, Supachok Sarachat, Ratthanakorn Maikami, and Anon Amornlerdsak have come through the ranks and are just some of the talents who've played for Buriram United. Buriram United also regularly supplies the Thai national youth teams with local talent. Buriram youth academies play in Thailand Youth League.

The International Youth Football Contest "CP-Meiji Cup U-14 International Championship" is a famous youth program that is held at Chang Arena Stadium and Training Ground Elephant Ground, between October–November every year, with six youth teams from Thailand's leading academies and 6 youth teams from Asia (Aspire Academy, Jubilo Iwata, Mokhtar Dahari Academy)

In 2018, Buriram United  appointed Andrew Ord as Head of Youth Development the coach who gave Chanathip Songkrasin his youth team debut at BEC Tero Sasana. He replaced Brazilian Jose Alves Borges.

Affiliated clubs

 Borussia Dortmund (2018–present)
Buriram United signed a collaboration agreement with Borussia Dortmund of the Bundesliga in October 2018. There is the deal to work together at youth level. Starting from U9 and going up to U19 the clubs discuss ways to develop youth players and give them the opportunity to press for places in the senior teams. Both teams have a similar philosophy in development as far as the use of technology, sports science and management in their youth programs.

 Leicester City (2020–present)
Buriram United signed a collaboration agreement with Leicester City of the Premier League in September 2020. The announcement event was graced by the manager of King Power Group Aiyawatt Srivaddhanaprabha together with Newin Chidchob. The collaboration of both clubs is part of a project known as "Thailand Smiles With You". The key goal of this partnership for both clubs is to send young Thai players to Europe to develop in a league which is a higher quality to those in Thailand. As part of this partnership Buriram club will send key players of the team namely Supachok Sarachat, Suphanat Mueanta, Supachai Jaided for professional football training at the facilities of Leicester City.

Sponsorship
The following are the sponsors of BRUTD (named "BRUTD Partners"):

Title Sponsors

In December 2017, Buriram United changed their stadium's name from "I-Mobile Stadium" to "Chang Arena" as part of a 5-year sponsorship deal with "Chang", one of Southeast Asia's largest beverage companies.

Main Sponsors
2019 season 

 Yamaha
 Italthai
 Muang Thai
 Coca-Cola
 CP
 Sponsor Energy Drink
 Ngerntidlor
 True
 Gulf Energy Development
 Grab

Kit evolution
First

Away

ACL special(First)

Stadium

Chang Arena is a 32,600 seater football stadium in Buriram, Buriram Province, Thailand. The Chang Arena is the second-largest football stadium in Thailand. Its nickname is "Thunder Castle".  Buriram United has led the 18-team Thai League (TL) in attendance since the move to the new stadium.

The Chang Arena is in the Mueang Buriram District, located about 3 kilometres southwest of central Buriram along highway 2445. The 150-acre site has a capacity of 32,600 people with parking for 800 cars and buses, plus 3,000 motorcycles. The pitch is floodlit; allowing for night matches. The stadium houses locker rooms for home and visiting teams provides modern medical facilities and live television and radio broadcasting infrastructure.

Stadium and locations

Continental record

Performance in AFC competitions
AFC Champions League: 10 appearances
 2009: Play-off round
 2012: Group stage
 2013: Quarter-finals
 2014: Group stage
 2015: Group stage
 2016: Group stage
 2018: Round of 16
 2019: Group stage
 2020: Play-off round
 2022: Play-off round
AFC Cup: 1 appearance
 2009: Group stage

Season by season record

P = Played
W = Games won
D = Games drawn
L = Games lost
F = Goals for
A = Goals against
Pts = Points
Pos = Final position

TPL = Thai Premier League
TL = Thai League
T1 = Thai League 1

DQ = Disqualified
PR = Preliminary Round
QR1 = First Qualifying Round
QR2 = Second Qualifying Round
QR3 = Third Qualifying Round
PO = Play-off
R1 = Round 1
R2 = Round 2
R3 = Round 3
R4 = Round 4

R5 = Round 5
R6 = Round 6
GS = Group Stage
KR = Knockout Round
R16 = Round of 16
QF = Quarter-finals
SF = Semi-finals
RU = Runners-up
S = Shared
W = Winners

Players

First-team squad

Out on loan

Management staff

Club Personnel

Coaching staff

Coaches
Coaches by years (2001–present)

Most trophies won
As of 29 May 2022

Honours

Domestic competitions

League 
 Thai League 1
Winners (8) : 2008, 2011, 2013, 2014, 2015, 2017, 2018, 2021–22
Runners-up (4): 2004–05, 2010, 2019, 2020–21

Cups
 Kor Royal Cup
Winners (4) : 2013, 2014, 2015, 2016
Runners-up (1): 2012
 FA Cup
Winners (5) : 2011, 2012, 2013, 2015, 2021–22
Runners-up (1): 2018
 League Cup
Winners (6) : 2011, 2012, 2013, 2015, 2016, 2021–22
Runners-up (2): 2014, 2019
 Thailand Champions Cup
Winners (1) : 2019
Runners-up (2): 2018, 2022

International competitions

ASEAN
Mekong Club Championship
Winners (2) : 2015, 2016

Double and Trebles 
 Double
Thai FA Cup and Thai League Cup (1): 2012
Kor Royal Cup and Thai League 1 (1): 2014

 Treble
Thai League 1, Thai FA Cup and Thai League Cup (4): 2011, 2013, 2015, 2021–22

Quadruple
 Quadruple
Kor Royal Cup, Thai League 1, Thai FA Cup and Thai League Cup (1): 2013, 2015

References

External links

 

 
Thai League 1 clubs
Buriram province
Football clubs in Thailand
Association football clubs established in 1970
1970 establishments in Thailand